Armand d'Artois (3 October 1788 – 28 March 1867) was a 19th-century French playwright and librettist, and also Achille d'Artois's brother.

Biography 
Trained for the bar, he first worked as an attorney but the success of his play Les Finacés, in 1808, caused him to devote himself entirely to literature. In 1814, he joined the guards of the king of Belgium, leaving military service after receiving the Legion of Honour in 1818.

A very prolific author, he wrote under various collective pseudonyms such as Emmanuel, with Emmanuel Arago, M. Sapajou, with Francis baron d'Allarde and Gabriel de Lurieu. Managing director of the Théâtre des Variétés from 1830 to 1836, he also directed Le Nain couleur de rose, a political, literary and moral newspaper from 15 September 1815 to 5 May 1816 and collaborated with La Foudre by Alphonse de Beauchamp.

His plays were presented on some of the most important Parisian stages of the 19th century: Théâtre du Vaudeville, Théâtre des Variétés, Théâtre des Nouveautés, Théâtre du Palais-Royal, Théâtre des Folies-Dramatiques, etc.

Works 

 Les Fiancés, ou l'Amour et le Hasard, comedy in 1 act, mingled with vaudevilles, with Théaulon, 1808
 Les Femmes soldats ou la Forteresse mal défendue, folie-vaudeville in 1 act, with Théaulon, 1809
 Les Femmes rivaux, arlequinade in 1 act and in vaudevilles, with Théaulon, 1809
 Les Pêcheurs danois, historical vaudeville in 1 act, with Théaulon, 1810
 Les Six Pantoufles ou le Rendez-vous des Cendrillons, folie-vaudeville in 1 act and in prose, with Dupin and Antoine-Pierre-Charles Favart, 1810
 Le Sultan du Havre, folie-vaudeville in 1 act and in prose, with Dupin, 1810
 Partie carrée ou Chacun de son côté, comédie en vaudevilles in 1 act, with Dumersan and Théaulon, 1810
 Les Trois Fous ou la Jeune Veuve, comédie en vaudevilles in 1 act, 1810
 Le Pacha de Suresne ou l'Amitié des femmes, 1811
 Les Pages au sérail, comédie en  vaudevilles in 2 acts, with Théaulon, 1811
 La Belle Allemande, historical fact in 1 act, with Henri Dupin, 1812
 Les Rendez-vous de minuit, comédie en vaudevilles in 1 act, with Dupin, 1812
 Bayard page, ou Vaillance et Beauté, trait historique in 2 acts and in vaudevilles, with Théaulon, 1812
 Le Boghey renversé ou Un point de vue de Longchamp, croquis in vaudevilles, with Théaulon and Étienne Jourdan, 1813
 Les Bêtes savantes, folie burlesque in 1 act and in vaudevilles, with Dumersan and Théaulon, 1813
 Le Nécessaire et le Superflu, comédie en vaudevilles in 1 act, with Théophile Marion Dumersan, 1813
 Le Cimetière du Parnasse ou Tippó malade, pompe funèbre in 1 act mingled with vaudevilles, with Théaulon, 1813
 La Tour de Witikind ou la Capitulation, comédie en vaudevilles in 1 act, with Dupin, 1813
 Le Courtisan dans l'embarras, comédie anecdote in 1 act, with Dupin, 1813
 Les maris ont tort, comédie en vaudevilles in 1 act, 1813
 L'Arbre de Vincennes, vaudeville héroïque in 3 acts, with Théaulon and Joseph-Denis Doche, 1814
 La Vénus hottentote, ou Haine aux françaises, with Nicolas Brazier and Théaulon, 1814
 La Route de Paris, ou les Allans et les Venans, tableau épisodique in 1 act, in vaudevilles, with Théaulon, 1814
 Les Clefs de Paris ou le Dessert d'Henri IV, trait historique in vaudeville, with Théaulon, 1814
 Psyché, ou la Curiosité des femmes, with Théaulon, 1814
 Les Visites, ou les Complimens du jour de l'an, tableau-vaudeville in 1 act, with Théaulon, 1814
 Le Roi et la Ligue, opéra comique in 2 acts, with Théaulon, 1815
 La Bataille de Denain, opéra comique in 3 acts, with Théaulon and Fulgence de Bury, 1816
 Un Mari pour étrennes, opéra comique in 1 act, with Théaulon, 1816
 La Rosière de Hartwell, comédie en vaudevilles in 1 act, with Achille d'Artois, 1816
 Charles de France, ou Amour et Gloire, opéra comique in 2 acts, with Théaulon, 1816
 Le Calendrier vivant ou Une année dans une heure, with Paul Ledoux and Théaulon, 1817
 Paris à Pékin, ou la Clochette de l'Opéra-Comique, parodie-féerie-folie in 1 act and in vaudevilles, with Théaulon and Marc-Antoine Désaugiers, 1817
 Robinson dans son isle, comedy in 1 act, mingled with couplets and extravaganza, with Michel-Nicolas Balisson de Rougemont, Nicolas Brazier and de Lurieu, 1817
 L'École de village ou l'Enseignement mutuel, 1818
 La Route d'Aix-la-Chapelle, tableau-vaudeville in 1 act, with Théaulon, 1818
 Le Rideau levé, ou le Siège du Parnasse, battle in couplets, with Théaulon, 1818
 Les Perroquets de la mère Philippe, comédie en vaudevilles in 1 act, with Achille d'Artois and Théaulon, 1818
 Monsieur Champagne, ou le Marquis malgré lui, comédie-vaudeville in 1 act, with Théaulon, 1818
 Le Magasin de chaperons, ou l'Opéra-comique vengé, folie-féerie-parodie in 1 act, with Désaugiers, 1818
 Les Bolivars et les Morillos ou les Amours de Belleville, caricatures in action, in 1 act, mingled with vaudevilles, with de Lurieu, 1819
 La Féerie des arts ou le Sultan de Cachemire, folie-féerie vaudeville in 1 act, with Francis and de Lurieu, 1819
 Angéline, ou la Champenoise, comédie en vaudevilles in 1 act, with Emmanuel Théaulon, 1819
 Le Procès de Jeanne-d'Arc, ou le Jury littéraire, with Pierre Carmouche and Henri Dupin, 1819
 Les Troqueurs, with Achille d'Artois, 1819
 Les Visites à Momus, folie-vaudeville in 1 act, with de Lurieu and Francis, 1819
 Les Vêpres odéoniennes, parody of the Vêpres siciliennes, with Antoine Jean-Baptiste Simonnin, 1819
 Le Mariage à la husarde, ou Une nuit de printemps, comedy in 1 act and in prose, mingled with vaudevilles, with W. Lafontaine, 1819
 Le Château de mon oncle ou le Mari par hasard, comedy in 1 act, with Désaugiers, 1819
 Les Trois Vampires ou le Clair de lune, folie-vaudeville in 1 act, with Brazier, 1820
 Le Diable d'Argent, review in 1 act and in vaudevilles, with Théaulon and Edmond Rochefort, 1820
 Clari à Meaux en Brie, pantomime burlesque, précédée de Cadet-Roussel maître de ballets, parade mingled with couplets, with Brazier and Dumersan, 1820
 Le Séducteur champenois, ou les Rhémois, comédie en vaudevilles in 1 act, with Charles Nombret Saint-Laurent and Saintine, 1820
 La Poste dramatique, folie-à-propos de Marie Stuart, sans unité de lieu; in 1 act, in prose, in verses, in couplets and in roulades, with Théaulon, 1820
 La Nina de la rue Vivienne, with de Lurieu and Francis, 1821
 La Solliciteuse, ou l'Intrigue dans les bureaux, comédie en vaudevilles in 1 act, with Théaulon, 1821
 Le Panorama de Paris, ou C'est fête partout !, entertainment in 5 acts, in vaudevilles, 1821
 La Marchande de goujons, ou les Trois Bossus, vaudeville grivois in 1 act, with Francis, 1821
 Le Parnasse gelé, ou les Glisseurs littéraires, folie-revue en 1 act, with Théaulon and Nicolas Gersin, 1821
 Jeanne d'Arc, ou la Délivrance d'Orléans, drame lyrique in 3 acts, with Théaulon, 1821
 Les Blouses ou la Soirée à la mode, comédie en vaudevilles in 1 act, with de Lurieu and Théaulon, 1822
 La Guerre ou la parodie de la paix, tragédie burlesque in 5 acts and in verses, with Théaulon and Laloue, 1822
 Guillaume, Gautier et Garguille ou le Cœur et la Pensée, with Francis and de Lurieu, 1822
 Le Comédien de Paris, comédie en vaudevilles in 1 act, with Eugène de Lamerlière, 1822
 Le Gueux, ou la Parodie du paria, tragédie burlesque in 5 acts and in verse, with Théaulon and Ferdinand Langlé, 1822
 Les Cris de Paris, tableau poissard in 1 act, mingled with couplets, with Francis and Simonnin, 1822
 Le Matin et le Soir, ou la Fiancée et la Mariée, comedy in 2 acts, mingled with couplets, with René de Chazet and Théaulon, 1822
 La Dame des belles cousines, 1823
 La Route de Poissy, comédie en vaudevilles in 1 act, with Francis, 1823
 Le Polichinelle sans le savoir, comédie-parade mingled with couplets, with Armand-François Jouslin de La Salle and Francis, 1823
 La Pauvre Fille, comédie en vaudevilles in 1 act, with Achille d'Artois and Michel Dieulafoy, 1823
 Julien ou Vingt-cinq ans d'entr'acte, comédie en vaudevilles in 2 acts, with Saintine, 1823
 Polichinelle aux eaux d'Enghien, tableau-vaudeville in 1 act, with Francis and Saintine, 1823
 Le Laboureur, ou Tout pour le Roi ! Tout pour la France !, comedy in 1 act and in prose, with Théaulon, 1823
 Les Femmes volantes, vaudeville-féerie in 2 acts, with Achille d'Artois and Théaulon, 1823
 L'Enfant de Paris, ou le Débit de consolations, with Francis and de Lurieu, 1823
 La Route de Poissy, 1823
 L'Orage, comédie en vaudevilles in 1 act, with Saintine, 1823
 La Petite Babet, ou les Deux Gouvernantes, comédie en vaudevilles in 1 act, with Francis, 1823
 La Famille du porteur d'eau, comédie en vaudevilles in 1 act, with Francis, 1824
 L'École des ganaches, with Francis and de Lurieu, 1824
 Thibaut et Justine, ou le Contrat sur le grand chemin, comédie-anecdotique in 1 act, mingled with couplets, with Francis and de Lurieu, 1824
 Le Perruquier et le Coiffeur, comedy in 1 act mingled with couplets, with Dupin and Thomas Sauvage, 1824
 Monsieur le pique assiette, comédie en vaudevilles in 1 act, with de Lurieu and Théaulon, 1824
 L'Imprimeur sans caractère, ou le Classique et le Romantique, with de Lurieu and Francis, 1824
 L'Homme de 60 ans ou la Petite Entêtée, comédie vaudeville in 1 act, with Simonnin and Laloue, 1824
 La Curieuse, comédie en vaudevilles in 2 acts, with Achille d'Artois and X-B de Saintine, 1824
 Les Personnalités, ou le Bureau des cannes, vaudeville épisodique in 1 act, with Francis and de Lurieu, 1824
 Les Deux Jockos, mimickery in 1 act, mingled with couplets, with Francis and de Lurieu, 1825
 L'Ami intime, comedy in 1 act, mingled with couplets, with Théaulon, 1825
 Les Lorrains, with Francis and de Lurieu, 1825
 Le Saint-Henri, entertainment, with Théodore Anne, 1825
 Le Champenois, ou les Mystifications, comédie en vaudevilles in 1 act, with Achille d'Artois and Francis, 1825
 La Grand'Maman, ou le Lendemain de noces, comédie en vaudevilles in 1 act, with Achille d'Artois and Francis, 1825
 Le Commissaire du bal, ou l'Ancienne et la Nouvelle Mode, comédie-anecdote mingled with vaudevilles, in 1 act, with Francis, 1825
 France et Savoie, comédie en vaudevilles in 2 acts, with Théaulon, 1825
 La Léocadie de Pantin, parodie de la Léocadie by Feydeau, with Dupin and Varner, 1825
 Les Inconvéniens de la diligence, ou Monsieur Bonnaventure, 6 tableaux-vaudeville in the same setting, with Francis, 1826
 Le Candidat, ou l'Athénée de Beaune, comédie en vaudevilles in 5 acts, with Théaulon and Francis baron d'Allarde, 1826
 Le Capitaliste malgré lui, comédie en vaudevilles in 1 act, with Francis and X.-B. Saintine, 1826
 Le Prisonnier amateur, comedy mingled with couplets, with Frédérick Lemaître, Alexis Decomberousse and Laloue, 1826
 Le Protecteur, comédie en vaudevilles in 1 act, with Francis and Théaulon, 1826
 Les Trous à la lune, ou Apollon en faillite, à-propos-folie in 1 act, with Francis and Théaulon, 1826
 Le Baron allemand, ou le Blocus de la salle à manger, with Gabriel de Lurieu, comédie en vaudevilles in 1 act, 1826
 Le Centenaire, ou la Famille des Gaillards, comédie en vaudevilles in 1 act, with Francis and Théaulon, 1826
 Les Jolis Soldats, tableau militaire, civil and vaudeville, imitated from Charlet, with Francis, 1826
 Le Médecin des théâtres, ou les Ordonnances, tableau épisodique in 1 act, with Théaulon and Francis, 1826
 M. François, ou Chacun sa manie, comedy in 1 act, mingled with couplets, with Francis, 1826
 Figaro ou le Jour de noces, play in 3 acts, after Beaumarchais, with Felice Blangini, 1827
 La Halle au blé ou l'Amour et la Morale, with Francis and Charles Nombret Saint-Laurent, 1827
 L'Homme de Paille, comedy in 1 act, mingled with vaudevilles, with Achille d'Artois and Francis, 1827
 Paris et Londres, comedy imitated from English, in 4 tableaux, with Mathurin-Joseph Brisset, 1827
 Le Futur de la grand'maman, comedy in 1 act, mingled with couplets, with Achille d'Artois and Édouard Monnais, 1827
 Clara Wendel, comédie en vaudevilles in 2 acts, with Francis and Théaulon, 1827
 La Nuit d'un joueur, ou le Petit Béverley, with de Lurieu and Joseph Aude, 1827
 La Villageoise somnambule, ou les Deux Fiancés, comédie en vaudevilles en 3 acts, with Dupin, 1827
 Les Deux Matelots, ou le Père malgré lui, comédie en vaudevilles in 1 act, with Francis, 1827
 Cartouche et Mandrin, comédie en vaudevilles in 1 act, with Henri Dupin, 1827
 Mon ami Pierre, with de Leuven and Auguste Pittaud de Forges, 1827
 Le Bon Père, comedy in 1 act, by Florian, arranged in vaudeville, with Achille d'Artois and Ferdinand Laloue, 1827
 Les Forgerons, comédie en vaudevilles in 2 acts, with Achille d'Artois and Francis, 1827
 Les Trois Faubourgs, ou le Samedi, le Dimanche et le Lundi, comédie en vaudevilles in 3 acts, with Francis and Théaulon, 1827
 Le Bourgeois de Paris, ou la Partie de plaisir, play in 3 acts and 5 tableaux, with Henri Dupin and Antoine-François Varner, 1828
 Le Caporal et le Paysan, with Alphonse Signol, 1828
 Le Portefeuille, with de Lurieu and de Forges, 1828
 Jean Pacot, ou Cinq ans d'un conscrit, comédie en vaudevilles in 5 acts, with Francis, 1828
 Le Château de M. le baron, comédie en vaudevilles in 2 acts, with Charles de Livry, 1828
 Le Brigand napolitain, with Adolphe de Leuven and de Forges, 1829
 Le Dernier Jour d'un condamné, époque de la vie d'un romantique, in 1 tableau, with a prologue in verse, with Victor Hugo, Michel Masson and Mathieu Barthélemy Thouin, 1829
 La Veille et le Lendemain ou Il faut bien aimer son mari, comédie en vaudevilles in 2 acts, with Achille d'Artois and Francis, 1829
 Les Suites d'un mariage de raison, with Victor Lhérie, 1829
 Les Enragés, tableau villageois in 1 act, with Brazier, 1829
 Les Mémoires contemporains, ou la Maison des fous, à propos in 1 act mingled with couplets, with de Lurieu and Masson, 1829
 La Grisette mariée, comédie en vaudevilles in 2 acts, with Charles-François-Jean-Baptiste Moreau de Commagny and Louis-Émile Vanderburch, 1829
 Monsieur de la Jobardière ou la Révolution impromptue, comedy in 1 act mingled with couplets, with Dupin and Dumersan, 1830
 Tom-Rick, ou le Babouin, play in 3 acts imitated from English, with Francis Cornu, and Francis, 1832
 La Femme du peuple, drama in 2 acts, mingled with couplets, with Dumersan, 1835
 Roger, ou le Curé de Champaubert, drama-vaudeville in 2 acts, with Julien de Mallian, 1835
 La Laitière et les Deux Chasseurs, ou l'Ours, le ballon, la grenouille et le pot au lait, imitated from Duni and Anseaume, with Félix-Auguste Duvert, Augustin-Théodore de Lauzanne de Vauroussel and X.-B. Saintine, 1837
 Nanon, Ninon et Maintenon ou les Trois Boudoirs, comedy in 3 acts, with Théaulon and Jean-Pierre Lesguillon, 1839
 Je m'en moque comme de l'an 40, review in 1 act, with Théaulon, 1839
 Valentine, comédie en vaudevilles in 2 acts, with Achille d'Artois, 1839
 Vingt-six ans, comedy in 2 acts and in prose, with Achille d'Artois, 1839
 Deux Systèmes, comédie en vaudevilles in 2 acts mingled with couplets, 1840
 Le Dompteur de bêtes féroces, folie-vaudeville in 1 act, with Théaulon, 1840
 Un jeune caissier, drama in 3 acts and in prose, awith Théaulon, 1840
 Une veuve de la grande armée, play in 4 acts, mingled with couplets, with Théaulon and Clairville, 1841
 Mme Gibou et Mme Pochet, ou le Thé chez la ravaudeuse, pièce grivoise in 3 acts, with Dumersan, 1841
 Le Flagrant Délit, comédie en vaudevilles in 1 act, with Edmond de Biéville, 1841
 Le Héros du marquis de quinze sous, comédie en vaudevilles in 3 acts, with de Biéville, 1843
 Une Idée de médecin, comedy in 1 act mingled with couplets, with Achille d'Artois, 1844
 Les Mystères de Passy, parody-vaudeville in 11 tableaux, 5 acts, with prologue and epilogue, with Rochefort, 1844
 La Gardeuse de dindons, comédie en vaudevilles in 3 acts, with de Biéville, 1845
 Un domestique pour tout faire, comédie en vaudevilles in 1 act, with Achille d'Artois, 1846
 La Fille obéissante, comédie en vaudevilles in 1 act, with Achille d'Artois, 1846
 Un Monsieur qui veut exister, comédie en vaudevilles in 1 act, with Achille d'Artois, 1849
 Les Saisons vivantes, with Roger de Beauvoir, 1850
 Une nuit orageuse, comédie en vaudevilles in 2 acts, with Jules Adenis, 1852
 Reculer pour mieux sauter, proverbe-vaudeville in 1 act, with Achille d'Artois, 1854

He also authored several songs.

Bibliography 
 Louis Gustave Vapereau, Dictionnaire universel des contemporains, 1870, (pp. 481)  (Read on line)
 Ferdinand Natanael Staaff, La littérature française depuis la formation de la langue jusqu'à nos jours, 1878, (pp. 1065)
 Larousse mensuel illustré, vol.2, 1913, (pp. 683)
 Henry Gidel, Le Vaudeville, 1986, (pp. 67)
 Olivier Bara, Le théâtre de l'opéra-comique sous la restauration, 2001, (pp. 116)

19th-century French dramatists and playwrights
French opera librettists
People from Oise
1788 births
1867 deaths
19th-century French male writers
French male dramatists and playwrights